Lazar Ćirković (Serbian Cyrillic: Лазар Ћирковић; born 22 August 1992) is a Serbian professional footballer who play as a centre-back for Honvéd.

Club career
Ćirković started his professional career with Serbian SuperLiga club Rad in the 2010–11 season. He was also loaned to Serbian League Vojvodina club Palić in the 2011–12 season. On 20 August 2014, Ćirković signed a four-year contract with Partizan. He made his official debut for the club in a UEFA Europa League game against Tottenham Hotspur on 18 September 2014.

International career
Ćirković made his competitive debut for the Serbia national under-21 team in a 3–1 home win over Northern Ireland on 15 October 2013. He was a member of the team at the 2015 UEFA Under-21 Championship.

Honours
Partizan
 Serbian SuperLiga: 2014–15, 2016–17
 Serbian Cup: 2016–17

References

External links
 
 

1992 births
Living people
Serbian footballers
Sportspeople from Niš
FK Palić players
FK Partizan players
FK Rad players
FC Luzern players
Maccabi Netanya F.C. players
Kisvárda FC players
Serbian SuperLiga players
Swiss Super League players
Israeli Premier League players
Nemzeti Bajnokság I players
Serbian expatriate footballers
Expatriate footballers in Switzerland
Expatriate footballers in Israel
Expatriate footballers in Hungary
Serbian expatriate sportspeople in Switzerland
Serbian expatriate sportspeople in Israel
Serbian expatriate sportspeople in Hungary
Serbia under-21 international footballers
Association football defenders